The  is the top singles title in the Japanese professional wrestling promotion Strong Style Pro-Wrestling. The title was established in 2005 and, as the name suggests, is mainly competed for by seasoned veterans of the sport. As it is a professional wrestling championship, the championship is not won not by actual competition, but by a scripted ending to a match determined by the bookers and match makers. On occasion the promotion declares a championship vacant, which means there is no champion at that point in time. This can either be due to a storyline, or real life issues such as a champion suffering an injury being unable to defend the championship, or leaving the company.

There have been a total of sixteen reigns shared among ten wrestlers. The current champion is Kengo Mashimo who is in his first reign.

Title history

Reigns

Combined reigns

See also
WEW Heavyweight Championship
KO-D Openweight Championship

Footnotes

References

External links
RJPW Legend Championship
Legend Championship  (in Japanese)

Professional wrestling championships
Openweight wrestling championships